South Warwickshire was a parliamentary constituency in the county of Warwickshire in England.  It returned two Members of Parliament (MPs) to the House of Commons of the Parliament of the United Kingdom, elected by the first past the post system.

History 

The constituency was created under the Reform Act 1832, when the former Warwickshire constituency was divided into two new divisions: North Warwickshire and South Warwickshire.

South Warwickshire was itself abolished in 1885, when the Redistribution of Seats Act 1885 replaced it with four new single-member constituencies: Nuneaton, Rugby, Stratford-on-Avon and Tamworth.

Boundaries
1832–1885: The Hundreds of Barlichway and Kington, and the Kenilworth and Southam Divisions of the Hundred of Knightlow.

Members of Parliament

Election results

Elections in the 1830s

 

 

 

Sheldon's death caused a by-election.

Elections in the 1840s

 
 

Mordaunt's death caused a by-election.

 
 

Shirley resigned by accepting the office of Steward of the Chiltern Hundreds, causing a by-election.

Elections in the 1850s

 
 

Greville succeeded to the peerage, becoming 4th Earl of Warwick and causing a by-election.

Elections in the 1860s

Elections in the 1870s

 
 

 

Seymour was appointed Comptroller of the Household, causing a by-election.

Elections in the 1880s

 

 

Leigh's death caused a by-election.

References

Parliamentary constituencies in Warwickshire (historic)
Constituencies of the Parliament of the United Kingdom established in 1832
Constituencies of the Parliament of the United Kingdom disestablished in 1885